Year 478 (CDLXXVIII) was a common year starting on Sunday (link will display the full calendar) of the Julian calendar. At the time, it was known as the Year of the Consulship of Illus without colleague (or, less frequently, year 1231 Ab urbe condita). The denomination 478 for this year has been used since the early medieval period, when the Anno Domini calendar era became the prevalent method in Europe for naming years.

Events 
 By place 

 Europe 
 Verina, mother-in-law of Eastern Roman Emperor Zeno, attempts to kill Isaurian general Illus for turning against her brother Basiliscus. A major revolt is led by her son-in-law Marcian and the Ostrogoth warlord Theodoric Strabo, but Illus again proves his loyalty to Zeno by quashing the revolt in 479.

 Asia 
 The first Shinto shrines are built in Japan.
 The Liu Song dynasty ends in China.
 Chinese chronicles record a memorial sent by the "King of Japan" (possibly Yūryaku), who describes himself as "Supreme Director of Military Affairs in Japan and Korea" to the Court of the Northern Wei Dynasty. The Chinese emperor responds by confirming the Japanese dynasty in those titles. This is the earliest verifiable date in Japanese history.

Births 
 Narses, Byzantine general (d. 573)

Deaths 
 Lupus of Troyes, French bishop and saint (approximate date)
 Shen Youzhi, Chinese general of Liu Song

References